Anson is a city in and the county seat of Jones County, Texas, United States. The population was 2,430 at the 2010 census. It is part of the Abilene, Texas metropolitan area. Originally named "Jones City", the town was renamed "Anson" in 1882 in honor of Anson Jones, the last president of the Republic of Texas.

Geography
Anson is located in central Jones County at  (32.755529, −99.896301). Three U.S. highways pass through the city. U.S. Routes 83 and 277 run north–south through the center as Commercial Avenue, while U.S. Route 180 crosses on 17th Street. US 83 leads northwest  to Aspermont, while US 277 leads northeast  to Stamford, and the highways together lead southeast  to Abilene. US 180 leads east  to Albany and west  to Snyder.

The city is part of the Brazos River watershed, with the southeast corner of the city crossed by Carter Creek, and the northern part draining to Redmud Creek.

Demographics

2020 census

As of the 2020 United States census, there were 2,294 people, 869 households, and 532 families residing in the city.

2000 census
As of the census of 2000, 2,556 people, 950 households, and 681 families resided in the city. The population density was 1,219.2 people per square mile (469.9/km2). The 1,089 housing units had an average density of 519.5 per square mile (200.2/km2). The racial makeup of the city was 75.82% White, 2.78% African American, 0.47% Native American, 0.74% Asian, 18.62% from other races, and 1.56% from two or more races. Hispanics or Latinos of any race were 32.63% of the population.

Of the 950 households, 35.2% had children under the age of 18 living with them, 51.8% were married couples living together, 16.1% had a female householder with no husband present, and 28.3% were not families. About 26.6% of all households were made up of individuals, and 18.0% had someone living alone who was 65 years of age or older. The average household size was 2.57, and the average family size was 3.10.

In the city, the population was distributed as 28.3% under the age of 18, 7.8% from 18 to 24, 24.2% from 25 to 44, 19.0% from 45 to 64, and 20.7% who were 65 years of age or older. The median age was 37 years. For every 100 females, there were 86.0 males. For every 100 females age 18 and over, there were 79.0 males.

The median income for a household in the city was $23,954, and for a family was $30,284. Males had a median income of $26,893 versus $19,038 for females. The per capita income for the city was $11,798. About 17.0% of families and 19.8% of the population were below the poverty line, including 25.0% of those under age 18 and 18.8% of those age 65 or over.

Traditions
Anson is home to the "Texas Cowboys' Christmas Ball", a three-night event held the weekend before Christmas. The first ball was held by M.G. Rhodes at his Star Hotel in Anson in 1885 and annually thereafter until 1890, when the hotel burned down. The event happened sporadically until it faded away during Prohibition. Teacher and folklorist Leonora Barrett revived the event in 1940. The dance was (and still is) held in Pioneer Hall, a Works Progress Administration project from the Great Depression. Music is usually provided by Michael Martin Murphey and his band.

Anson also may or may not have been the inspiration for the movie "Footloose" and, as of 1987, still had an enforced "no dancing" law on the books that is/was only lifted for the annual Christmas dance.  An effort was made in 1987 to change the ordinance to allow supervised dancing, which was successful. The conflict was the basis for the book, No Dancin' In Anson: An American Story of Race and Social Change, by University of Texas professor Ricardo Ainslie.

Education
The city is served by the Anson Independent School District and is home to the Anson High School Tigers.

Notable people

 Omar Burleson, late U.S. representative born in Anson
 Greg Glazner, Walt Whitman Award-winning poet born in Anson
 Jeannie C. Riley, Country singer who in the second half of 1968 had a number-one pop and country hit with "Harper Valley PTA"; born in Anson

Gallery

Climate
The climate in this area is characterized by hot, humid summers and generally mild to cool winters.  According to the Köppen climate classification system, Anson has a humid subtropical climate, Cfa on climate maps.

References

External links
City of Anson official website

Cities in Texas
Cities in Jones County, Texas
County seats in Texas
Cities in the Abilene metropolitan area